The APM 20 Lionceau is a two-seat very light aircraft manufactured by the French manufacturer Issoire Aviation.
Despite its classic appearance, it is entirely built from composite materials, especially carbon fibers.

Designed by Philippe Moniot and certified in 1999 (see EASA CS-VLA), this very light (400 kg empty, 634 kg loaded) and economical (80 PS engine) aircraft is primarily intended to be used to learn to fly, but also to travel with a relatively high cruise speed (113 knots).

A three-seat version, the APM 30 Lion, was presented at the 2005 Paris Air Show.

Specifications

References

External links

APM 20 Lionceau official website 

Low-wing aircraft
1990s French civil utility aircraft
Single-engined tractor aircraft
Aircraft first flown in 1995
APM20